Wan'an is a town under the administration of Xinluo District, Longyan, Fujian, China. , it has 20 villages under its administration.

References 

Township-level divisions of Fujian
Longyan